Paul Aymé (29 July 1869 in Marseille – 25 July 1962 in Madrid) was a French tennis player

Tennis career
Paul Aymé is best remembered for winning the French Championship four straight years; 1897, 1898, 1899, and 1900.

References 
 Bud Collins: Total Tennis – The Ultimate Tennis Encyclopedia (2003 Edition).

External links
 

19th-century French people
19th-century male tennis players
French Championships (tennis) champions
French male tennis players
Tennis players from Marseille
1869 births
1962 deaths